Lisa Regina (born ) is an American actress, screenwriter, director, and acting coach.

Early life and education 
Regina was born in Philadelphia and was raised in Gloucester Township, New Jersey. She attended Triton Regional High School before attending New York University.

Career 
Regina wrote, directed, and produced the documentary Kenny about a man suffering from the rare skin disease ichthyosis. The film promotes tolerance of others. This film won the Manhattan Global Film Festival and a Humanitarian Award. Her latest film, shot in New Jersey, is about bullying.

Among her acting credits, Regina played a minor character in an episode of The Sopranos. In 2006, she was cast in a recurring role on the soap opera All My Children. She has appeared in national commercial campaigns for Delta Sky Miles, K-Mart and Macy's, and as a host for the 2010 Maxwell Football Club awards.

In 2007, Regina began a stage performance called "A Write to Heal", which aims to raise awareness on domestic violence.

Filmography

Film

Television

References

External links

1961 births
Living people
American screenwriters
American soap opera actresses
American television actresses
American acting coaches
New York University alumni
People from Gloucester Township, New Jersey
Anti-bullying activists
American writers of Italian descent
Actresses from Philadelphia
21st-century American women